Wenceslaus Joseph van Lint (born 28 March 1948) is a former Australian rules footballer who played with South Melbourne in the Victorian Football League (VFL).

Van Lint arrived in Australia in 1952, and played two games for South Melbourne while completing his economics degree at Monash University. He qualified as a Certified Public Accountant and was awarded a Master of Business Administration from Melbourne University in 1979.

Notes 

Wenceslaus Jozef van Lint is married to Patricia Elizabeth van Lint they have three children Allison, Matthew and Jessica and eight grand children Aleisha, Patrick, Noah, Ezra, Tomas, Sienna, Nicholas and Micah

External links 

Living people
1948 births
VFL/AFL players born outside Australia
Australian rules footballers from New South Wales
Sydney Swans players